The true owls or typical owls (family Strigidae) are one of the two generally accepted families of owls, the other being the barn owls (Tytonidae).  This large family comprises 230 living or recently extinct species in 24 genera. The typical owls have a cosmopolitan distribution and are found on every continent except Antarctica.

Morphology

While typical owls (hereafter referred to simply as owls) vary greatly in size, with the smallest species, the elf owl, being a hundredth the size of the largest, the Eurasian eagle-owl and Blakiston's fish owl, owls generally share an extremely similar body plan. They tend to have large heads, short tails, cryptic plumage, and round facial discs around the eyes. The family is generally arboreal (with a few exceptions like the burrowing owl) and obtain their food on the wing. The wings are large, broad, rounded, and long. As is the case with most birds of prey, in many owl species females are larger than males.

Because of their nocturnal habits, they tend not to exhibit sexual dimorphism in their plumage. Specialized feathers and wing shape suppress the noise produced by flying, both taking off, flapping and gliding. This silent flight allows owls to hunt without being heard by their prey. Owls possess three physical attributes that are thought to contribute to their silent flight capability. First, on the leading edge of the wing, there is a comb of stiff feathers. Second, the trailing edge of the wing contains a flexible fringe. Finally, owls have downy material distributed on the tops of their wings that creates a compliant but rough surface (similar to that of a soft carpet). All these factors result in significant aerodynamic noise reductions. The toes and tarsi are feathered in some species, and more so in species at higher latitudes. Numerous species of owls in the genus Glaucidium and the northern hawk-owl have eye patches on the backs of their heads, apparently to convince other birds they are being watched at all times. Numerous nocturnal species have ear-tufts, feathers on the sides of the head that are thought to have a camouflage function, breaking up the outline of a roosting bird. The feathers of the facial disc are arranged in order to increase sound delivered to the ears. Hearing in owls is highly sensitive and the ears are asymmetrical allowing the owl to localise a sound in multiple directions. Owls can pinpoint the position of prey, such as a squeaking mouse, by computing when the sound from the object reaches the owl's ears. If the sound reaches the left ear first, the mouse must be to the left of the owl. The owl's brain will then direct the head to directly face the mouse. In addition to hearing, owls have massive eyes relative to their body size. Contrary to popular belief, however, owls cannot see well in extreme dark and are able to see well in the day.

Owls are also able to rotate their heads by as much as 270 degrees in either direction without damaging the blood vessels in their necks and heads, and without disrupting blood flow to their brains. Researchers have found four major biological adaptations that allow for this unique capability. First, in the neck there is a major artery, called the vertebral artery, that feeds the brain. This artery passes through bony holes in the vertebra. These bony holes are ten times larger in diameter than the artery that passes through them (extra space in the transverse foramina). This creates cushiony air pockets that allow for more movement of the artery when twisted. 12 of the 14 cervical vertebrae in the owl's neck have this adaptation. This vertebral artery also enters the neck higher up than it does in other birds. Instead of going in at the 14th cervical vertebrae, it enters in at the 12th cervical vertebrae. Finally, the small vessel connection between the carotid and the vertebral arteries allow the exchanging of blood between two blood vessels. These cross connections allow for uninterrupted blood flow to the brain. This means that even if one route is blocked during extreme head rotations, another route can continue blood circulation to the brain.

Several owl species also have fluorescent pigments called porphyrins under their wings. A large group of pigments defined by nitrogen-containing pyrole rings, including chlorophyll and heme (in animal blood), make up the porphyrins. Other bird species will use porphyrins to pigment eggshells in the oviduct. Owl species, however, use porphyrins as a pigment in their plumage. Porphyrins are most prevalent in new feathers and are easily destroyed by sunlight. Porphyrin pigments in feathers fluoresce under UV light, allowing biologists to more accurately classify the age of owls. The relative ages of the feathers are differentiated by the intensity of fluorescence that they emit when the primaries and secondaries are exposed to black light. This method helps to detect the subtle differences between third and fourth generation feathers, whereas looking at wear and color makes age determination difficult.

Niche competition

It has been noted that there is some competition for niche space between the spotted owl and the barred owl (both of which are true owls) . This competition is related to deforestation, and therefore a reduction in niche quantity and quality. This deforestation is more specifically the result of overlogging and forest fires. These two species of owl are known to traditionally live in mature forests of old and tall trees, which at this point in time are mostly limited to public lands. As niche overlap is occurring in these two families, there is a concern with the barred owls encroaching on the spotted owl's North American habitats, causing a decline of the spotted owl. As noted above, these species prefer mature forests which, due to deforestation, are at limited supply and take a long time to reestablish after deforestation has occurred. Because the northern spotted owl shares its territories and competes with other species, it is declining at a more rapid pace. This invasion by barred owls occurred about 50 years ago in the Pacific Northwest, and despite their low numbers, they are considered an invasive species because of the harm done to native spotted owls. In this competition for resources, hunting locations and general niches, the barred owl is pushing the spotted owl to local extinction. It is thought that the rapid decrease in population size of spotted owls will cause a trophic cascade, since the spotted owls help provide a healthy ecosystem.

Behaviour
Owls are generally nocturnal and/or crepuscular and spend much of the day roosting. They are often misperceived as ‘tame’ since they allow humans to approach quite closely before taking flight, but in reality they are attempting to avoid detection through stillness. Their cryptic plumage and the inconspicuous locations they adopt are an effort to avoid predators and mobbing by small birds.

Communication
Owls, such as the eagle-owl, will use visual signaling in intraspecific communication (communication within the species), both in territorial habits and parent-offspring interactions. Some researchers believe owls can employ various visual signals in other situations involving intraspecific interaction. Experimental evidence suggests that owl feces and the remains of prey can act as visual signals. This new type of signaling behavior could potentially indicate the owls' current reproductive state to intruders, including other territorial owls or non-breeding floaters. Feces are an ideal material for marking due to its minimal energetic costs, and can also continue to indicate territorial boundaries even when occupied in activities other than territorial defense. Preliminary evidence also suggests that owls will use feces and the feathers of their prey to signal their breeding status to members within the same species.

Migration

Some species of owl are migratory. One such species, the northern saw-whet owl, migrates south even when food and resources are ample in the north.

Habitat, climate and seasonal changes

Some owls have a higher survival rate and are more likely to reproduce in a habitat that contains a mixture of old growth forests and other vegetation types. Old growth forests provide ample dark areas for owls to hide from predators  Like many organisms, spotted owls rely on forest fires to create their habitat and provide areas for foraging. Unfortunately, climate change and intentional fire suppression have altered natural fire habits. Owls avoid badly burned areas but they benefit from the mosaics of heterogeneous habitats created by fires. This is not to say that all fires are good for owls. Owls only thrive when fires are not of high severity and not large stand-replacing (high-severity fires that burn most of the vegetation) which create large canopy gaps that are not adequate for owls.

Parasites

Avian malaria or Plasmodium relictum affects owls and specifically, 44% of northern and Californian spotted owls harbor 17 strains of the parasite. As mentioned in the niche competition section above, spotted owls and barred owls are in competition so their niche overlap may be resulting in the plasmodium parasite having more hosts in a concentrated area but this is not certain.

Predators
The main predators of owls are other species of owls. An example of this occurs with the northern saw-whet owl that lives in the northern U.S. and lives low to the ground in brushy areas typically of cedar forests. These owls eat mice, and perch in trees at eye level. Their main predators are barred owls and great horned owls.

Systematics

The family Strigidae was introduced by the English zoologist William Elford Leach in a guide to the contents of the British Museum published in 1820.

A molecular phylogenetic study of the owls by Jessie Salter and collaborators published in 2020 found that the family Strigidae was divided into two sister clades and some of the traditional genera were paraphyletic. The placement of three monotypic genera remained uncertain due to the degraded nature of the available DNA. Based on these results Frank Gill, Pamela Rasmussen and David Donsker updated the online list of world birds that they maintain on behalf of the International Ornithological Committee (IOC).

The cladogram below is based on the results of the study by Salter and collaborators published in 2020. The subfamilies are those defined by Edward Dickinson and James Van Remsen Jr. in 2013. A genetic study published in 2021 suggested that the genus Scotopelia may be embedded within Ketupa.

The 235 extant or recently extinct species are assigned to 23 genera:

 Genus Uroglaux – Papuan hawk-owl
 Genus Ninox – Australasian hawk-owls, 37 species of which one is recently extinct
 Genus Margarobyas – bare-legged owl or Cuban screech-owl
 Genus Taenioptynx – two species previous placed in Glaucidium
 Genus Micrathene – elf owl
 Genus Xenoglaux – long-whiskered owlet
 Genus Aegolius – saw-whet owls, five species of which one is recently extinct
 Genus Athene –  nine species
 Genus Surnia – northern hawk-owl
 Genus Glaucidium – pygmy owls, 29 species
 Genus Otus – scops owls, 58 species including three extinct species formerly placed in Mascarenotus 
 Genus Ptilopsis – white-faced owls, two species
 Genus Asio – eared owls, nine species
 Genus Jubula – maned owl
 Genus Bubo – eagle-owls, horned-owls and snowy owl, 10 species 
 Genus Scotopelia – fishing owls, three species
 Genus Ketupa – fish owls and eagle-owls, 12 species (including 9 species previously placed in Bubo)
 Genus Psiloscops – flammulated owl
 Genus Gymnasio – Puerto Rican owl
 Genus Megascops – screech-owls, 25 species
 Genus Pulsatrix – spectacled owls, three species
 Genus Lophostrix – crested owl
 Genus Strix – earless owls, 22 species, including four previously placed in Ciccaba

Late Quaternary prehistoric extinctions
 Genus Grallistrix – stilt-owls, four species
Kaua‘i stilt-owl, Grallistrix auceps
Maui stilt-owl, Grallistrix erdmani
Moloka‘i stilt-owl, Grallistrix geleches
O‘ahu stilt-owl, Grallistrix orion
 Genus Ornimegalonyx – Caribbean giant owls, one or two species
Cuban giant owl, Ornimegalonyx oteroi
Ornimegalonyx sp. – probably subspecies of O. oteroi
 Genus Asphaltoglaux
 Asphalt miniature owl, Asphaltoglaux cecileae
Genus Oraristrix
La Brea owl, Oraristrix brea

Fossil record
 Mioglaux (Late Oligocene? – Early Miocene of WC Europe) – includes "Bubo" poirreiri
 Intulula (Early/Middle Miocene of WC Europe) – includes "Strix/Ninox" brevis
 Alasio (Middle Miocene of Vieux-Collonges, France) – includes "Strix" collongensis

The fossil database for Strigiformes is highly diverse and shows an origin from ~60MYA into the Pleistocene. The maximum age range for the Strigiformes clade extends to 68.6MYA.

Placement unresolved:
"Otus/Strix" wintershofensis – fossil (Early/Middle Miocene of Wintershof West, Germany) – may be close to extant genus Ninox
 "Strix" edwardsi – fossil (Middle Miocene of Grive-Saint-Alban, France)
 "Asio" pygmaeus – fossil (Early Pliocene of Odessa, Ukraine)
 Strigidae gen. et sp. indet. UMMP V31030 (Rexroad Late Pliocene of Kansas, USA) – Strix/Bubo?
Ibiza owl, Strigidae gen. et sp. indet. – prehistoric (Late Pleistocene/Holocene of Es Pouàs, Ibiza)

The supposed fossil heron "Ardea" lignitum (Late Pliocene of Germany) was apparently a strigid owl, possibly close to Bubo. The Early–Middle Eocene genus Palaeoglaux from west-central Europe is sometimes placed here, but given its age, it is probably better considered its own family for the time being.

References

Bibliography
Olson, Storrs L. (1985). The fossil record of birds. In: Farner, D.S.; King, J.R. & Parkes, Kenneth C. (eds.): Avian Biology 8: 79–238. Academic Press, New York.

External links

ITIS – Strigidae Taxonomy
Typical owl videos on the Internet Bird Collection
The Owl Pages about owls – photos, calls, books, art, mythology and more.

Owls